Sayyeda  Nusrat Jahan Begum (1865–1952),  and Hazrat Amman Jan ‘Beloved Mother'  within the Ahmadiyya Community, was the second wife of Mirza Ghulam Ahmad and the daughter of Mir Nasir Nawab of Delhi. The marriage is seen, within the Community, as having fulfilled certain prophecies.

Family history
The family had descended from the “Ahl al-Bayt” (Family) of Muhammad, hence called the “Sada'at”. The genealogical tree connects her to Hussain the grandson of Muhammad after 40 generations. Her forefathers had migrated from Bukhara in the reign of the Mughul  King  Shah Jahan.  The well known Urdu poet and Mystic Khwaja Mir Dard (1721–1785) was the great grand father of Nusrat Jahan Begum.

Early life
Nusrat Jahan Begum was born to Mir Nasir Nawab (1846 – 19 September 1924) and Sayyad Begum (1849 – 24 November 1932) in Delhi in 1865. In her young age she was also called ‘Ayesha Begum’ and ‘Naseer ul Jehan’.

Marriage to Mirza Ghulam Ahmad

The marriage of  Nusrat Jahan Begum and  Mirza Ghulam Ahmad took place in November 1884, at Delhi, and was performed by Nazir Husayn Dehlawi, the pre-eminent figure within the Ahl-i Hadith movement in Delhi. Nazir Husayn was so old and weak that he was brought in a  Doli (palanquin, also known as palkhi). The Dower was fixed Rs.1100. Ghulam Ahmad paid the cleric Rs.5 and a 'Prayer mat'. Very few of his friends had accompanied Ghulam Ahmad to Delhi. They included a servant Hamid Ali and a Hindu friend Lala Malawa Mal.

A spiritual order

The great-grandfather of  Nusrat Jahan, with the name  Muhammad Nasir Andaleeb (1692–1758), is said to be a known poet and spiritual personality. He had been the author of many books, prose and poetry. Muhammad Nasir Andaleeb was a contemporary of Shah Waliullah (1703–1762), Shah Abdul Aziz  (1745–1823), and Muhammad  Fakhr-ud-din. It is reported that he saw a vision that his Spiritual Order shall last till the Mahdi appears and will then get merged in the Order established by the Mahdi.

Nusrat Jahan Begum and claims of Ahmad
Mirza Ghulam Ahmad claimed he had received a divine revelation on 20 February 1886; two years after his wedding to  Nusrat Jahan. Till then he had no issues from her. He published his divine revelations as an Announcement 

Mirza Ghulam Ahmad also predicted that a son would be born to him, a possessor of great qualities. He wrote in the same Announcement (20 February 1886):

Children
Ten children were born to Nusrat Jahan Begum:

Five children died young:

 Ismat (15 April 1886 – July 1891)
 Bashir (7 August 1887 – 4 November 1888)
 Shaukat (1891–1892)
 Mirza Mubarik Ahmad (14 June 1899 – 16 September 1907)
 Amtul Naseer (28 January 1903 – 3 December 1903)

Five children lived longer:

 Mirza Basheer-ud-Din Mahmood Ahmad (12 January 1889 – 8 November 1965)
 Mirza Bashir Ahmad (20 April 1893 – September 1963)
 Mirza Sharif Ahmad (24 May 1895 – December 1961)
 (Nawab) Mubarika Begum (2 March 1897 – 23 May 1977)
 (Nawab) Sahiba Amtul Hafeez Begum (25 June 1904 – 6 May 1987)

Last days

Nusrat Jahan Begum joined Mirza Ghulam Ahmad in 1884, five years before the foundation of the Ahmadiyya Muslim Community in 1889 and lived till the age of 87. She died in 1952.

References

Indian Ahmadis
Family of Mirza Ghulam Ahmad
1865 births
1952 deaths
People from Delhi
Hashemite people
Indian people of Arab descent